Totara Heights is a suburb of Auckland, New Zealand. It is located south of Goodwood Heights, east of Wiri and north of The Gardens.

Demographics

Totara Heights had a population of 2,712 at the 2018 New Zealand census, an increase of 372 people (15.9%) since the 2013 census, and an increase of 318 people (13.3%) since the 2006 census. There were 741 households, comprising 1,374 males and 1,341 females, giving a sex ratio of 1.02 males per female. The median age was 33.9 years (compared with 37.4 years nationally), with 564 people (20.8%) aged under 15 years, 630 (23.2%) aged 15 to 29, 1,242 (45.8%) aged 30 to 64, and 279 (10.3%) aged 65 or older.

Ethnicities were 37.7% European/Pākehā, 14.0% Māori, 23.6% Pacific peoples, 38.3% Asian, and 3.4% other ethnicities. People may identify with more than one ethnicity.

The percentage of people born overseas was 42.6, compared with 27.1% nationally.

Although some people chose not to answer the census's question about religious affiliation, 29.0% had no religion, 42.3% were Christian, 0.9% had Māori religious beliefs, 9.4% were Hindu, 4.4% were Muslim, 3.0% were Buddhist and 5.5% had other religions.

Of those at least 15 years old, 519 (24.2%) people had a bachelor's or higher degree, and 303 (14.1%) people had no formal qualifications. The median income was $38,300, compared with $31,800 nationally. 366 people (17.0%) earned over $70,000 compared to 17.2% nationally. The employment status of those at least 15 was that 1,236 (57.5%) people were employed full-time, 261 (12.2%) were part-time, and 87 (4.1%) were unemployed.

References

External links
Photographs of Totara Heights held in Auckland Libraries' heritage collections. 

Suburbs of Auckland